Donald William Lord (October 13, 1928 – April 27, 2010) was a Canadian football player who played for the BC Lions and Edmonton Eskimos. He previously played football at the University of British Columbia.

References

1928 births
2010 deaths
Canadian football ends
UBC Thunderbirds football players
Edmonton Elks players
BC Lions players
Players of Canadian football from British Columbia
Canadian football people from Vancouver